Standings and results for Group 3 of the UEFA Euro 2004 qualifying tournament.

Group 3 consisted of Austria, Belarus, Czech Republic, Moldova and Netherlands. Group winners were Czech Republic, who finished 3 points clear of second-placed team Netherlands.

Standings

Matches

Goalscorers

References
UEFA Page
RSSSF Page

Group 3
2002–03 in Dutch football
qual
2002–03 in Czech football
2003–04 in Czech football
Czech Republic at UEFA Euro 2004
2002–03 in Austrian football
2003–04 in Austrian football
2002–03 in Moldovan football
2003–04 in Moldovan football
2002 in Belarusian football
2003 in Belarusian football